(+)-Car-3-ene synthase (EC 4.2.3.107, 3-carene cyclase, 3-carene synthase, 3CAR, (+)-3-carene synthase) is an enzyme with systematic name geranyl-diphosphate diphosphate-lyase [cyclizing, (+)-car-3-ene-forming]. This enzyme catalyses the following chemical reaction

 geranyl diphosphate  (+)-car-3-ene + diphosphate

The enzyme reacts with (3S)-linalyl diphosphate twice as rapidly as geranyl diphosphate.

References

External links 
 

EC 4.2.3